The Rich River Classic was a golf tournament held in Australia in 1986 and 1987 at Rich River Golf Club, Moama, NSW. The event was played concurrently with the Australian PGA Seniors' Championship. The event was discontinued after the ESP Open was allocated the dates on the professional tournament calendar in 1988, and a new tournament for trainees was created to play alongside the seniors championship.

Winners

References

Former PGA Tour of Australasia events
Golf tournaments in Australia
Golf in New South Wales
Recurring sporting events established in 1986
Recurring events disestablished in 1987